Dr Allan Blunden is a British translator who specializes in German literature. He is best known for his translation of Erhard Eppler’s The Return of the State? which won the Schlegel-Tieck Prize. He has also translated biographies of Heidegger and Stefan Zweig and the prison diary of Hans Fallada.

He lives in Liskeard, Cornwall.

Translations
 Erhard Eppler, The Return of the State?
 Hans Fallada, A Stranger in My Own Country: The 1944 Prison Diary
 Oliver Matuschek, Three Lives: A Biography of Stefan Zweig
 Hugo Ott, Martin Heidegger: A Political Life

References

British translators
Year of birth missing (living people)
Living people